The Battle of Rio de Janeiro was a battle in 1558 on the French town at Rio de Janeiro, called Henriville. The Portuguese, though in far smaller numbers, defeated the French and made them flee to the jungle. The French town was then burnt by Mem de Sá, the Portuguese governor.

Background

A few years before, the French admiral and colonist Villegagnon and his friend and comrade, Admiral Coligny, managed to build a fort in the area of modern-day Rio de Janeiro which they called Fort Coligny. As the French colony grew in size and power it was named Henriville and became a serious threat to the Portuguese establishment in Brazil.

References

A Tentativa dos Franceses se estabelecerem no Brasil 

Rio de Janeiro
Rio de Janeiro
16th century in Brazil
Military history of Brazil
Portuguese colonization of the Americas
Conflicts in 1558
1558 in South America
1558 in Brazil
France Antarctique